The 1969 European Ladies' Team Championship took place 3–6 July at Halmstad Golf Club in Tylösand, Sweden. It was the sixth women's golf amateur European Ladies' Team Championship.

Venue 

The tournament was played at the North course at Halmstad Golf Club in Tylösand, Halmstad Municipality, 9 kilometers west of  Halmstad city center in Halland County, Sweden. The club was founded in 1930. Its first 18-hole course was constructed by Rafael Sundblom and approved in 1938. A new course was inaugurated in 1967, when nine new holes were constructed, which together with the last nine holes of the old course formed the new North Course.

Format 
All participating teams played one qualification round of stroke-play with up to five players, counted the four best scores for each team.

The eight best teams formed flight A, in knock-out match-play over the next three days. The teams were seeded based on their positions after the stroke play. Each of the four best placed teams were drawn to play the quarter final against one of the teams in the flight placed in the next four positions. In each match between two nation teams, two 18-hole foursome games and five 18-hole single games were played. Teams were allowed to switch players during the team matches, selecting other players in to the afternoon single matches after the morning foursome matches.

The four teams placed 9–12 in the qualification stroke-play formed Flight B to play similar knock-out play and the four teams placed 13–15 formed Flight C, to meet each other to decide their final positions.

Teams 
A record number of 15 nation teams contested the event. Czechoslovakia, Luxemburg and Norway took part for the first time. Each team consisted of a minimum of four players.

Players in the leading teams

Other participating teams

Winners 
Two-times champion team France won the opening 18-hole competition, with a score of 28 over par 316, 15 strokes ahead of host nation Sweden.

Individual leader in the opening 18-hole stroke-play qualifying competition was Brigitte Varangot, France, with a score of 3-over-par 75, two shots ahead of teammate and 1967 U.S. Women's Open champion Catherine Lacoste, who made her first appearance in the European Ladies' Team Championship. There was no official award for the lowest individual score.

Team France won the championship earning their third title, beating defending champions England in the final 6–1.

Results 
Qualification round

Team standings

* Note: In the event of a tie the order was determined by the better non-counting score.

Individual leaders

 Note: There was no official award for the lowest individual score.

Flight A

Bracket

Final games

Flight B

Bracket

Flight C

Final standings

Sources:

See also 
 Espirito Santo Trophy – biennial world amateur team golf championship for women organized by the International Golf Federation.
 European Amateur Team Championship – European amateur team golf championship for men organised by the European Golf Association.

References

External links 
 European Golf Association: Results

European Ladies' Team Championship
Golf tournaments in Sweden
European Ladies' Team Championship
European Ladies' Team Championship
European Ladies' Team Championship